Philotherma is a genus of moths in the family Lasiocampidae. The genus was erected by Heinrich Benno Möschler in 1887.

Species
Philotherma apithana Hering, 1928
Philotherma brunnea (Aurivillius, 1909)
Philotherma clara Bethune-Baker, 1908
Philotherma fusca Aurivillius, 1909
Philotherma fuscescens Hampson, 1910
Philotherma goliath (Viette, 1962)
Philotherma grisea Aurivillius, 1915
Philotherma heringi Szent-Ivány, 1942
Philotherma jacchus Möschler, 1887
Philotherma kittenbergeri Szent-Ivány, 1942
Philotherma leucocyma (Hampson, 1909)
Philotherma media Aurivillius, 1909
Philotherma melambela Tams, 1936
Philotherma rectilinea Strand, 1912
Philotherma rennei (Dewitz, 1881)
Philotherma rosa (Druce, 1887)
Philotherma rufescens Wichgraf, 1921
Philotherma simplex Wichgraf, 1914
Philotherma sordida Aurivillius, 1905
Philotherma spargata (Holland, 1893)
Philotherma tandoensis Bethune-Baker, 1927
Philotherma thoracica (Butler, 1895)
Philotherma unicolor (Walker, 1855)
Philotherma vulpecula Strand, 1918

External links

Lasiocampidae
Moth genera
Taxa named by Heinrich Benno Möschler